Rich is a surname. Notable people with this name include:

A–L
Adam Rich (1968–2023), American actor
Adrienne Rich (1929–2012), American poet
Buddy Rich (1917–1987), American jazz drummer and bandleader
Charlie Rich (1932–1995), American country music singer-songwriter and musician
Christopher Rich (theatre manager) (1657–1714), English producer and theatre manager
Claudius James Rich, British orientalist
Daniel Rich (born 1990), Australian rules footballer
Darrell Keith Rich (1955–2000), Native American serial killer
Denis Rich (born 1954), Australian rules football umpire
Frank Rich (born 1949), American writer
Frederick Henry Rich (1824–1904), British soldier and Railway official 
George Rich (1863–1956), Australian lawyer and High Court judge
Georgina Rich, British actor
Heather Rich, Oklahoma high-school student victim Murder of Heather Rich
Helen Rich (1827–1915), American writer
Henry Rich, 1st Earl of Holland (1590–1649), English courtier and soldier
Sir Henry Rich, 1st Baronet (died 1869), British politician
Henry Bayard Rich (1849–1884), British soldier
Herb Rich (1928–2008), American 2x All-Pro football player
Hugo Rich (aka Olaf Dietrich), Australian criminal (Dietrich v The Queen)
Irene Rich (1891–1988), American actress
Jodee Rich, Australian businessman
Joel Rich (1824–1906), Wisconsin state senator
John Rich (born 1974), American musician
John Rich (producer) (1692–1761), English producer and theatre manager
John Treadway Rich (1841–1926), American politician, aka John Tyler Rich
Katherine Rich (born 1967), New Zealand politician
Lillian Rich (1900–1954), British-born American silent film actress

M–Z
Marc Rich (aka Marc David Reich) (1934–2013), American businessman
Martin Rich (1905–2000), German conductor
Matty Rich (born 1971), American film director and screenwriter
Michael Rich (cyclist) (born 1969), German cyclist
Michael D. Rich, American executive
Mike Rich (born 1959), American screenwriter
Nathan Rich, American Scientology critic and content creator
Patricia Vickers-Rich (born 1944), Australian palaeontologist
Patrick Rich, English rugby league player
Paul Rich (1921–2000), English singer and music publisher
Ralph M. Rich (1916–1942), American aviator
Randy Rich (born 1953), American football player
Richard Rich, 1st Baron Rich (1496–1567), Lord Chancellor
Richard Rich (director), American animated film director
Richie Rich (rapper) (aka Richard Serrel), American rapper
DJ Richie Rich, British disc jockey
Rishi Rich (aka Rishpal Rekhi), British Asian music producer
Robert Rich (musician), American musician
Robert Rich, pen name used by American screenwriter and novelist Dalton Trumbo
Robert Rich, 2nd Earl of Warwick (1587–1658), British naval officer and politician
Sir Robert Rich, 4th Baronet (1685–1768), British field marshal
Robert E. Rich Sr. (1913–2006), American food-processing pioneer
Seth Rich, American employee of the Democratic National Committee, murdered in 2016
Sharon Rich, American biographer
Stephen Gottheil Rich (1890–1958), philatelist of New Jersey
Tommy Rich (aka Thomas Richardson) (born 1956), American professional wrestler

See also
Rich family
Rich baronets

de:Rich
fr:Rich
it:Rich#Persone